Housebroken may refer to:

 Housebreaking, the process of training a domesticated animal to excrete outdoors
 HouseBroken, an American adult animated sitcom created by Jennifer Crittenden, Clea DuVall, and Gabrielle Allan

See also